Tianxi was a Chinese era name used by several emperors of China. It may refer to:

Tianxi (276), used by Sun Hao, emperor of Eastern Wu
Tianxi (399–401), used by Duan Ye, king of Northern Liang
Tianxi (1017–1021), used by Emperor Zhenzong of the Song dynasty
Tianxi (1178–1218), used by Yelü Zhilugu, emperor of Qara Khitai (Western Liao)

It also refers to The Cullinan, a skyscraper in Hong Kong.